Seventh Sojourn is the eighth album by the Moody Blues (the seventh by this particular line-up), recorded at Decca Studio 4 on Tollington Park in North London, and released in 1972.

Music and lyrics 
Although the album's lyrics address political concerns, in the 1990 documentary The Moody Blues: Legend of a Band, bassist John Lodge described "I'm Just a Singer (In a Rock and Roll Band)" as a response to fans who mistakenly read guru-like wisdom into the Moodies' lyrics.

Instrumentally, singer/keyboardist Mike Pinder, in addition to the Mellotron used on previous Moody Blues albums, used a similar keyboard device called the Chamberlin.

According to Moody Blues' bassist John Lodge, "The album was very loosely based on the idea of The Canterbury Tales by Chaucer. This is how Seventh Sojourn evolved: we told stories, but musically."

Reception 
Seventh Sojourn reached #5 in the United Kingdom, and became the band's first American chart topper, spending five weeks at #1 to close out 1972.

Two hit singles came from this album: "Isn't Life Strange" (#13 UK, #29 US) and "I'm Just a Singer (In a Rock and Roll Band)" (#36 UK, #12 US). However, both songs were overshadowed by the re-release of "Nights in White Satin," which had been first released in 1967. Whereas both singles from Seventh Sojourn made the top 40, "Nights In White Satin" bested both, hitting #9 in the UK and #2 in the United States and gaining the highest American chart position for a Moody Blues single.

Classic Rock History critic Brian Kachejian rated three songs from Seventh Sojourn as being among the Moody Blues' 10 best – "New Horizons", "Lost in a Lost World" and "For My Lady".

Aftermath 
As this album proved difficult to record, with a 1973 follow-up quickly shelved after inception, the group decided to go on hiatus after their tour of Asia in 1974 (Mike Pinder's last tour with the group), before reuniting in 1977 for Octave (1978) and its subsequent tour without Pinder.

In April 2007 the album was remastered into SACD format and repackaged with four extra tracks. "Island", the fourth bonus track, is an unfinished recording from 1973, made during the brief sessions for a follow-up album that never happened.

In 2008 a remaster for standard audio CD was issued with the same bonus tracks.

Track listing

Personnel
Justin Hayward ― vocals, guitars
John Lodge ― vocals, bass, acoustic guitar
Ray Thomas ― vocals, flute, tambourine, saxophone, oboe
Graeme Edge ― drums, percussion, vocals
Mike Pinder ― vocals, Chamberlin, piano, harmonium

Production
Producer - Tony Clarke
Recording engineers - Derek Varnals and Tony Clarke ("Isn't Life Strange")
Assistant engineer - David Baker
Cover and liner art - Phil Travers
Innersleeve - The Moodies
All instruments played by The Moody Blues
Recorded at Tollington Park Studios, London

Charts

Certifications

References

The Moody Blues albums
1972 albums
Threshold Records albums
Albums produced by Tony Clarke (record producer)